Petelia capitata is a moth of the family Geometridae first described by Francis Walker in 1867. It is found in Borneo.

Sexes show sexual dimorphism. The wingspan of male is 11 mm, and the female's is 17 mm. The wings are maroon red with variable white markings.

References

Moths of Asia
Moths described in 1867